Ruvarac is a Serbian surname and family. It may refer to:

Ilarion Ruvarac (1832–1905), Orthodox priest and historian
Dimitrije Ruvarac (1842–1931), Orthodox priest, politician and historian
Kosta Ruvarac (1837–1864), writer and literary critic.

Serbian surnames
Serbian families
Serb families